The 2011–12 Sacred Heart Pioneers men's basketball team represented Sacred Heart University during the 2011–12 NCAA Division I men's basketball season. The Pioneers, led by thirty-fourth year head coach Dave Bike, play their home games at the William H. Pitt Center and are members of the Northeast Conference.

Recruiting

Roster

Schedule

|-
!colspan=9 style=|Regular Season

|-
!colspan=9 style=| NEC tournament

References

Sacred Heart Pioneers men's basketball seasons
Sacred Heart
Sacred Heart Pioneers men's b
Sacred Heart Pioneers men's b